Jacques Carette (born 1 March 1947) is a former athlete from France who competed mainly in the 400 metres.

He competed for a France in the 1972 Summer Olympics held in Munich, Germany in the 4 x 400 metre relay where he won the bronze medal with his team mates Gilles Bertould, Daniel Velasques, and Francis Kerbiriou.

References

Sports Reference

1947 births
Living people
Sportspeople from Roubaix
French male sprinters
Olympic bronze medalists for France
Athletes (track and field) at the 1968 Summer Olympics
Athletes (track and field) at the 1972 Summer Olympics
Olympic athletes of France
European Athletics Championships medalists
Medalists at the 1972 Summer Olympics
Olympic bronze medalists in athletics (track and field)
Universiade medalists in athletics (track and field)
Universiade bronze medalists for France
Medalists at the 1970 Summer Universiade
20th-century French people
21st-century French people